Wésley Braz de Almeida (born 7 May 1981), better known as Wésley Brasilia, is a Brazilian professional footballer.

He is a Brazilian player of prolonged experience in international football of very low level. In his extensive career he has played for Celaya of Mexico, Daejeon Citizen of South Korea, Marathón in Honduras, Atlético Marte in El Salvador and Persepolis of Iran.

However, in his native Brazil he has had a more extensive career, but of lower profile that in foreign football, having played for Londrina, Santo André, Brasiliense, Rio Verde, CRAC, CAP Uberlândia and in teams of even lower profile like Taguatinga, Taguatinga, Sociedade Esportiva Santa Maria and Botafogo-DF.

Club career statistics

 Assist Goals

Honours
Hazfi Cup
Winner: 1
2009/10 with Persepolis

References

External links

1981 births
Living people
Brazilian footballers
Brazilian expatriate footballers
Esporte Clube Santo André players
União Agrícola Barbarense Futebol Clube players
Paulista Futebol Clube players
Sporting Cristal footballers
Brasiliense Futebol Clube players
América Futebol Clube (RN) players
Dibba Al-Hisn Sports Club players
Persepolis F.C. players
Expatriate footballers in Iran
Daejeon Hana Citizen FC players
K League 1 players
Brazilian expatriate sportspeople in South Korea
Expatriate footballers in South Korea
Association football forwards
UAE First Division League players
Deportivo Ayutla players
Sportspeople from Goiás